Opachychi was a village in the Vyshhorod Raion (district), in Kyiv Oblast (province) of central Ukraine, located south-east of Chernobyl. It belongs to Ivankiv settlement hromada, one of the hromadas of Ukraine.

History
The village is infamous for being an outlying area within the Chernobyl accident exclusion zone. The permanent population was evacuated following the 1986 accident, and officially the village was liquidated (i.e. excluded from the list of settlements of Kyiv Oblast) in 1999. However, despite radioactive contamination a few residents (samosely) have returned to live there, and as of 28 March 2006 the population was 19.

Until 18 July 2020, Opachychi belonged to Ivankiv Raion. The raion was abolished that day as part of the administrative reform of Ukraine, which reduced the number of raions of Kyiv Oblast to seven. The area of Ivankiv Raion was merged into Vyshhorod Raion.

From February to April 2022, Opachychi was occupied by Russia as a result of the 2022 invasion.

See also
Chernobyl Exclusion Zone

References

Villages in Vyshhorod Raion
Ghost towns in the Chernobyl Exclusion Zone